David Wyn Roberts (1911 in Cardiff, Wales – 8 November 1982) was a British architect and educator, who designed more university buildings for Cambridge University than any other architect. With a modernist practice based in Cambridge, he also designed many city housing projects, schools, and private residences.

Early life
Roberts' father, John Roberts, was a preacher and historian of the Presbyterian Church of Wales.  David Roberts was educated at the Cardiff High School and Welsh School of Architecture, and was awarded the 1936 RIBA Soane Medal.

David Roberts was commissioned as an officer in the Royal Engineers in August 1942 and he served in the Italian campaign.

Roberts married architect Margaret MacDonald Baird, and they settled in Cambridge where they built their house at 11 Wilberforce Road. Their only son, Nicholas Wyn Roberts, born in 1948, became an architect and professor of architecture at Woodbury University in Los Angeles.

Career

Roberts began teaching at the Department of Architecture, University of Cambridge in 1946, and became a fellow of Magdalene College, Cambridge in 1958. He influenced many students and employees who became scholars and architects, including Anthony Vidler, Lionel March, Nicholas Ray, Cedric Price, and John G. Ellis. Roberts was a modernist architect in postwar Cambridge with his University Health Centre built in 1951.  Roberts's earliest college work was at Magdalene where, in Benson and Mallory Courts, he created a small townscape; he refurbished existing houses, and built new infill, to create a street effect, rather than imposing the conventional form of a college courtyard.

With his headquarters overlooking the Cam, Roberts kept his office small, six to eight people. Many young architects passed through the practice.  Rory Spence wrote in the catalogue, David Roberts Architect, "He seemed to approach each job with fresh enthusiasm and great integrity. It is no wonder that he had such admiration for Philip Webb and the meticulous individual care which he lavished on each design. Like Webb, David never worked to a formula, as so many of even the best architects do, and possibly for this reason his buildings are less well-known than they should be. There is always a strong idea at the heart of each building, related to its context, which is unique to that building". A former student, Geoffrey Clarke, became a partner in 1964.

Roberts is described as the first architect to specialise in modern educational buildings. He gave a stepped profile to his designs for student accommodation (for example at Clare College in 1956 and Jesus College in 1963) to give the rooms a dual aspect. His student accommodation buildings at Jesus College, Cambridge and St Hugh's College, Oxford, have already been given a heritage listing of Grade II.

Roberts and his wife are buried together in the Ascension Parish Burial Ground in Cambridge.

Notable works

University Health Centre, Gresham Road, Cambridge, 1949
St Mary's Convent School, Bateman Road, Cambridge, 1955–1971
River Building, Magdalene College, Cambridge, 1956
Clare Hostel, Chesterton Lane, Cambridge, 1957
Boathouse for Sidney Sussex College, Cambridge, 1957
The Snowcat, Arbury Road, Cambridge, 1959
Sacher Building, New College, Oxford, 1961
St Bede's School, Birdwood Road, Cambridge, 1961
Dominican Priory, Buckingham Road, Cambridge, 1961
North Court, Jesus College, Cambridge, 1963
Fitzwilliam Museum, Trumpington Street, Cambridge, 1963
Kenyon Building, St Hugh's College, Oxford, 1964 (now Grade II listed)
Roscoe and Gladstone Halls of Residence, University of Liverpool, 1965
Churchill College, Wolfson Flats, Cambridge, 1965
St Hugh's College, Stage II, Oxford, 1966
Cromwell Court, Sidney Sussex College, Cambridge, 1982

Collaboration with Geoffrey Clarke
New Master's Lodge, Magdalene College, Cambridge, 1966
East Road Development, Cambridge, 1968
Buckingham Court, Magdalene College, Cambridge, 1968
Cosin Court, Tennis Court Terrace, Cambridge, 1969
Wolfson Court, Clarkson Road, Girton College, Cambridge, 1970
Trinity Hall, Central Site Development, Cambridge, 1973
Fitzwilliam Museum, Stage II, Cambridge, 1973
Burrell's Field, Grange Road, Cambridge, 1976
Darwin College, Silver Street, Cambridge, 1977
Rose Crescent Shops, Rose Crescent, Cambridge, 1979

References 

1982 deaths
1911 births
20th-century Welsh architects
Academics of the University of Cambridge
Alumni of the Welsh School of Architecture
Architects from Cardiff
People from Cambridge
Royal Engineers officers
Welsh scholars and academics